Semionis is a genus of braconid wasps in the family Braconidae. There are three described species in Semionis, two of them extinct.

Species
These three species belong to the genus Semionis:
 Semionis rarus Nixon, 1965 (South Africa)
 † Semionis nixoni Tobias, 1987 (Baltic amber)
 † Semionis wightensis Belokobylskij, 2014 (Bembridge Marls)

References

Microgastrinae